Adrian Coroon Elrick (born 29 September 1949 in Scotland) was an association football player who represented New Zealand.

Moving from Scotland at a young age to New Zealand, Adrian became part of the Auckland football scene.  He spent most of his career playing for North Shore United.

Elrick made his full All Whites debut in a 2–0 win over China on 26 July 1975.

He represented the All Whites for all three matches at the 1982 FIFA World Cup in Spain, where they lost to Scotland, USSR and Brazil. Elrick was fortunate enough to grab Zico's coveted No.10 shirt at the end of the New Zealand vs. Brazil game.

Elrick ended his international playing career having pulled on the all white shirt 92 times, including 53 A-international caps in which he scored one goal, his final cap coming in a 0–1 loss to Bahrain on 24 April 1984.

References

External links
 

1949 births
Living people
New Zealand association footballers
1982 FIFA World Cup players
New Zealand international footballers
Association football fullbacks
Association football sweepers
North Shore United AFC players